The Men's pentathlon P54-58 event for wheelchair athletes at the 2004 Summer Paralympics was held in the Athens Olympic Stadium on 20 September. It was won by Ling Yong, representing .

References

M